Cooking Light was an American monthly food and lifestyle magazine founded in 1987 and active until December 2018. It was owned by Meredith Corporation. Each month, the magazine included approximately 100 original recipes as well as editorial content covering food trends, fitness tips, and other culinary and health-related news.

In September 2018, Meredith Corporation announced that Cooking Light would be combined with EatingWell and that the last print issue would be published in December 2018. After merging with EatingWell, the new publication launched with a January/February 2019 issue and would be published 10 times per year.

Editors
Katherine M. Eakin (1987–1993)
Doug Crichton (1993–2001)
Mary Kay Culpepper (2001–2009)
Scott Mowbray (2009–2014)
Hunter Lewis (2014-December 2018)

References

External links
 

Defunct Meredith Corporation magazines
Food and drink magazines
Magazines established in 1987
Magazines disestablished in 2018
Magazines published in Alabama
Mass media in Birmingham, Alabama
Monthly magazines published in the United States
Southern Progress Corporation